Gibson Township is one of thirteen townships in Washington County, Indiana, United States. As of the 2010 census, its population was 1,176 and it contained 511 housing units.

Geography

Cities, towns, villages
 Little York

Unincorporated towns
 Georgetown at 
 Gooseport at 
 Pumpkin Center at 
(This list is based on USGS data and may include former settlements.)

Adjacent townships
 Grassy Fork Township, Jackson County (north)
 Vernon Township, Jackson County (northeast)
 Finley Township, Scott County (southeast)
 Franklin Township (south)
 Washington Township (southwest)
 Monroe Township (west)

School districts
 Salem Community Schools

Political districts
 Indiana's 9th congressional district
 State House District 73
 State Senate District 45

References
 United States Census Bureau 2007 TIGER/Line Shapefiles
 United States Board on Geographic Names (GNIS)
 IndianaMap

External links
 Indiana Township Association
 United Township Association of Indiana

Townships in Washington County, Indiana
Townships in Indiana